Razliq Castle is a historical castle located in Sarab County in East Azerbaijan Province, The longevity of this fortress dates back to the 1st millennium BC.

References 

Castles in Iran